The 2013 Marist Red Foxes football team represented Marist College in the 2013 NCAA Division I FCS football season. They were led by 22nd year head coach Jim Parady and played their home games at Tenney Stadium at Leonidoff Field. They were a member of the Pioneer Football League. They finished the season 8–3, 7–1 in PFL play to finish in a tie for the league title with Butler. Marist lost a tie-breaker to Butler and did not receive the league's automatic bid to the FCS playoffs and did not receive and at-large bid.

Schedule

Source: Schedule

References

Marist
Marist Red Foxes football seasons
Pioneer Football League champion seasons
Marist Red Foxes football